Kurli may refer to:

 Kurli, Andhra Pradesh, a village in Anantapur district, Andhra Pradesh state, India
 Kurli, Karnataka, a village in Belgaum district, Karnataka state, India
 Kurli, Maharashtra, a village in Sindhudurg district, Maharashtra state, India